Bridge of Allan Football Club was a Scottish association football club based in Bridge of Allan, Stirlingshire. The club was founded in 1878 and disbanded in 1899. The club competed in the Scottish Cup for four seasons between 1880 and 1891 as well as the regional Stirlingshire Cup competition. From 1890 onwards, the club's home colours were black and gold shirts with navy shorts. The club played its home matches at Westerton Park before moving to Coneyhill Park in 1881 where it remained until 1899 when the club disbanded.

References

External links 

Defunct football clubs in Scotland
Association football clubs established in 1878
1878 establishments in Scotland
Association football clubs disestablished in 1899
1899 disestablishments in Scotland